Bryce E. Reeves (born November 28, 1966) is an American politician serving as a member of the Senate of Virginia. A State Farm insurance agent, he was elected in 2011. Reeves defeated the 28-year Democratic incumbent, Edd Houck, by 226 votes.

Reeves  the 17th district in the central part of the state, consisting of portions of Albemarle County, Culpeper County, Louisa County, Spotsylvania County, and all of Fredericksburg City and Orange County. Reeves serves on the Courts of Justice, General Laws and Technology, Privileges and Elections, and the Rehabilitation and Social Services committees. He is also the co-chair of the Military Caucus.

In 2017, he entered the Republican primary for Lieutenant Governor, but lost to State Senator Jill Vogel.

He lives in Spotsylvania County, Virginia, with his wife, Anne, and their two children.

Electoral history

References

External links
 Campaign website

1966 births
21st-century American politicians
Candidates in the 2022 United States House of Representatives elections
Living people
People from Spotsylvania County, Virginia
Politicians from Fredericksburg, Virginia
Republican Party Virginia state senators